A Lady and Gentleman in Black is a painting by the Dutch artist Rembrandt, painted in 1633. The painting hung in the Isabella Stewart Gardner Museum of Boston, Massachusetts, prior to being one of 13 works stolen from the museum in a 1990 theft.

Provenance
The authorship of the painting has been debated. In 1987, the Rembrandt Research Project (RRP) disattributed the work, considering it a product of the artist's workshop. However, the RRP re-attributed the painting to Rembrandt again in its corpus published in 2015, in which it is called Portrait of a couple in an interior.  X-ray examination of the painting reveals that Rembrandt originally painted a child leaning on the seated lady's leg.  Art historians speculate that the child died young and that the couple asked for the image to be painted out so as not to bring back painful memories.

Bernard Berenson purchased the painting on behalf of collector Isabella Stewart Gardner. 

It hung in the Isabella Stewart Gardner Museum of Boston, Massachusetts, United States, prior to being stolen on March 18, 1990. Following the theft, the painting has not resurfaced. A reward is offered for the return of the stolen items.

See also 
 Isabella Stewart Gardner Museum theft

References

1633 paintings
Paintings by Rembrandt
Stolen works of art